Woolley Miners Welfare F.C. was an English association football club based in Woolley, South Yorkshire.

History
The club entered the Yorkshire League in 1971, and would win back-to-back promotions in their first two seasons to reach the top flight, before being relegated back down to Division 3 again by 1977.

In 1982 the Yorkshire League merged with the Midland League to form the Northern Counties East League, and Woolley were the first winners of the NCEL Division 2 South title. They spent the rest of their history in Division 1 and reached the final of the Sheffield & Hallamshire Senior Cup in 1989, before withdrawing from the NCEL and dissolving a year later.

League and cup history

Honours

League
Yorkshire League Division 2
Promoted: 1972–73
Yorkshire League Division 3
Promoted: 1971–72
Northern Counties East League Division 2 South
Promoted: 1982–83 (champions)

Cup
Sheffield & Hallamshire Senior Cup
Runners-up: 1988–89

Records
 Best FA Trophy performance – 2nd Qualifying round, 1973/74
 Best FA Vase performance – 2nd Round, 1975/76

References

Defunct football clubs in England
Defunct football clubs in South Yorkshire
Sheffield Association League
Yorkshire Football League
Barnsley Association League
Northern Counties East Football League
Mining association football teams in England